"Need Your Love" is a song by  American DJs and record producers Gryffin and Seven Lions, featuring vocals from American singer-songwriter Noah Kahan. It was released from Gryffin's debut studio album Gravity.

Background
The song is written in the key of C major, with a tempo of 104 beats per minute. On May 1, 2020, Gryffin released a "Need Your Love" remix EP.

Track listing

Charts

Weekly charts

Year-end charts

References

2020 songs
Gryffin songs
Seven Lions songs
Songs written by Gryffin
Songs written by Sandro Cavazza